Sorin Ionel Rădoi (born 16 January 1990) is an Italian-born Romanian professional footballer who currently plays for Promozione Emilia-Romagna side ACD Gambettola.

Biography
Rădoi started his professional career at Santarcangelo, where he won 2010–11 Serie D Group F. In June 2011 he was signed by Siena for €55,000. On the same day he left for A.C. Pavia for a peppercorn of €500. On 31 January 2012 Rădoi left for Valenzana in temporary deal. In June 2012 Siena gave up the remain 50% registration rights to Pavia.

After no appearance for Pavia in 2012–13 Lega Pro Prima Divisione, Rădoi returned to Santarcangelo in co-ownership deal, with Andrea Parodi left for Pavia from Santarcangelo in a temporary deal. In June 2013 Pavia also gave up the remain 50% registration rights. Circa 9 January 2014 he left for Rimini.

Honours
Santarcangelo
Serie D: 2010–11

References

External links
 AIC profile (data by football.it) 
 
 Sorin Rădoi at Tuttocampo

Romanian footballers
Italian people of Romanian descent
Santarcangelo Calcio players
A.C.N. Siena 1904 players
F.C. Pavia players
Valenzana Mado players
Rimini F.C. 1912 players
Ravenna F.C. players
A.C. Cuneo 1905 players
Forlì F.C. players
Serie C players
Serie D players
Association football forwards
Romanian expatriate footballers
Expatriate footballers in Italy
Romanian expatriate sportspeople in Italy
Footballers from Bucharest
1990 births
Living people
Pinerolo F.C. players
Campionato Sammarinese di Calcio players